Hemiarcha metableta is a moth in the family Gelechiidae. It was described by Turner in 1933. It is found in Australia, where it has been recorded from Queensland.

References

Hemiarcha
Moths described in 1933